The KTSSM (Korean Tactical Surface-to-Surface Missile) is a short-range tactical ballistic missile (TBM) developed by the Agency for Defense Development (ADD) and Hanwha Group in 2017 to respond to North Korea's artillery power.

Design and development
The KTSSM was developed with the intention of quickly neutralizing North Korean long-range artillery. Dubbed the "artillery killer," Hanwha Corporation designed the missile in partnership with the Agency for Defense Development (ADD). Four missiles can be launched almost simultaneously from a fixed launch pad and they can travel ; the launcher and missiles as a set have a combined cost of $1.9 million. While it resembles the American MGM-140 ATACMS missile, the KTSSM is cheaper and more accurate with a shorter range, though still adequate to perform the counterbattery role. There are two versions of the missile: KTSSM-1 for attacking M1978/M1989 Koksan 170 mm howitzers and M1985/M1991 240 mm unguided multiple rocket launchers (MRLs); and KTSSM-2, a self-propelled system tasked with engaging KN-09 300 mm MRLs and KN-02 short-range ballistic missiles, having a Block I version employing a thermal penetrating warhead and a Block II version with a unitary high-explosive warhead.

Development lasted from 2014-2017 at a cost of USD$418 million, and it was successfully test-launched in October 2017. In March 2018, the South Korean Army announced it would create a new artillery brigade composed of KTSSM-2 and K239 Chunmoo multiple launch rocket systems with the aim of destroying North Korea’s hardened long-range artillery sites near the Korean Demilitarized Zone, to be inaugurated in October of that year. Fielding was planned for 2019, but initially postponed to 2023 because the United States had yet to approve the purchase of important components. In 2019, it was reported that the KTSSM would be deployed in 2021. In November 2020, Defense Acquisition Program Administration (DAPA) announced mass production would begin for the missile to enter service in 2022, with more than 200 units planned to be made by 2025.

On 21 December 2022, the Agency for Defense Development conducted a public test of KTSSM-2 under further development at Anheung Proving Ground. The missile was mounted on the K239 Chunmoo vehicle and hit a target 200 kilometers away after it was launched.

On 13 March 2023, the 150th Defense Project Promotion Committee deliberated and approved the basic strategy and system development plan for developing a vehicle-mounted Tactical Surface-to-Surface Missile, and the revised plan included the agenda of completing the development of KTSSM-2 by 2032, two years earlier than the previous plan.

Export

Poland
In October 2022, an agreement was signed to deliver 288 K239 Chunmoo K-MLRS to the Polish Land Forces. The first stage of the program has a supply of ammunition, including KTSSM-II TBMs, which is planned to ultimately be produced by Poland itself.

See also 
Hyunmoo
MGM-140 ATACMS

References

External links
Chapter 4: The Korean Peninsula: North Korea’s Growing Nuclear and Missile Threat and South Korea’s Anguish

Ballistic missiles of South Korea
Tactical ballistic missiles